IFK Värnamo is a Swedish football club located in Värnamo. The club plays in the Allsvenskan, the top tier of Swedish football. The most famous player from the club is Jonas Thern, who was captain of the Swedish national football team when they finished third in the 1994 FIFA World Cup.

Season to season

Attendances

In recent seasons IFK Värnamo have had the following average attendances:

* Attendances are provided in the Publikliga sections of the Svenska Fotbollförbundet website.

Players

First-team squad

Out on loan

Achievements

League
 Division 1 Södra:
 Winners (1): 2010
Winners (1): 2020
Superettan:
Winners (1): 2021

Footnotes

References

External links

 Official site

 
Football clubs in Jönköping County
Sport in Jönköping County
Association football clubs established in 1912
1912 establishments in Sweden
Idrottsföreningen Kamraterna